The Connacht Senior Football Championship is an annual Gaelic football competition for the senior county teams of Connacht GAA. All of the counties of Connacht participate in the championship, as well as counties London and New York. The winning team receives the Nestor Cup.

The Connacht Senior Football Championship is run on a knock-out basis in which once a team loses they are eliminated from the competition. A series of games are played during the summer months and the final is played in June or July. The winner progresses directly to the All-Ireland Super 8s, while losing teams progress to the All-Ireland Qualifiers (before 2001 the All-Ireland was a straight knock-out format meaning all losing teams were eliminated after a single defeat).

Galway are Connacht's most successful county with 9 All Ireland titles. Roscommon have won the competition 24 times, most recently in 2019. Sligo have won the Nestor cup three times, most recently in 2007, while Leitrim have won the competition twice, most recently in 1994. The competing counties play for the JJ Nestor Cup, which is presented to the winning captain on Connacht Final Day.

London have competed in the Connacht Senior Football Championship since 1975, while New York joined in 1999. In this time London have managed three victories: one in 1977 and two in 2013, against Sligo and Leitrim.

Current team details
The Connacht championship is contested by the five counties in the Irish province of Connacht and the two foreign-based teams of London and New York.

Managers

Managers in the Connacht Championship are involved in the day-to-day 
running of the team, including the training, team selection, and sourcing of players from the club championships. Their influence varies from county-to-county and is related to the individual county boards. From 2018, all inter-county head coaches must be Award 2 qualified. The manager is assisted by a team of two or three selectors and an extensive backroom team consisting of various coaches. Prior to the development of the concept of a manager in the 1970s, teams were usually managed by a team of selectors with one member acting as chairman.

Top winners
A golden background denotes years in which the Connacht champions also won the All-Ireland Championship.

Roll of honour

Notes:
 1888-1891 No Connacht representative in All-Ireland series
 1892 Roscommon represented the province
 1893-1899 No Connacht representative in All-Ireland series
 1900 Galway unopposed
 1902 Galway unopposed
 1946 Objection and counter-objection. Replay ordered
 1939 Game unfinished - awarded to Mayo
 1922 Objection - refixed

Statistics

List of winners

List of Connacht Senior Football Championship winners

Most recent championship meetings 

COVID-19 caused the following games to be cancelled in 2020: Galway's games against both New York and Sligo, Roscommon's game against London, and in 2021: Mayo playing London and Roscommon playing New York meant that 2021 was a fresh draw. 

In 2023, Sligo vs London, Leitrim vs New York.
In 2024, Galway vs London, Mayo vs New York.
In 2025, Roscommon vs London, Galway vs New York.
In 2026, Mayo vs London, Roscommon vs New York.
In 2027, Sligo vs New York, while London scheduled to host Leitrim like in 2022.

See also
 All-Ireland Senior Football Championship
 Ulster Senior Football Championship
 Munster Senior Football Championship
 Leinster Senior Football Championship

References

 
1
3